XHVACM-FM, known as , is a public station on 102.9 FM in Cuernavaca, Morelos, Mexico.

History
The state network of Morelos took form in 1985. On February 4, XHVAC-FM "Universal Stereo" took to the air on 102.9 FM after testing throughout January. The next day, the Yautepec station, XHYTE-FM 90.9 "Estéreo Campesina" came to air. On June 1, the Jojutla station, XHJLA-FM "Viva FM" signed on, and on November 19, the state network was completed on AM with XECTA-AM 1390 "Radio Líder" in Cuautla. In 1989, the stations received proper permits.

In the late 1990s, after the dissolution of the Morelos Radio and Television System (SMRTV), technical deterioration set in. XHVAC's dated transmitter began to fade, and the other stations each remained off air for long stretches of time and relayed it at other times. SMRTV was reformed in 2000, but it was not until 2012 and its transformation into the autonomous IMRyT that the stations improved.

Transmitters

The transmitters all had an M added to their call signs in 2013 when they received new permits.

References

External links

1985 establishments in Mexico
Radio stations established in 1985
Radio stations in Morelos
Spanish-language radio stations